Dimitar Varbanov Ganev (28 October 1898 in Gradets, Sliven Province – 20 April 1964) was a Bulgarian communist politician. He became the Chairman of the Presidium of the National Assembly of Bulgaria (nominal head of state of Bulgaria) on 30 November 1958, shortly after the death of Georgi Damyanov, and served in that capacity until his own death on 20 April 1964.

References

 

1898 births
1964 deaths
People from Sliven Province
Bulgarian Communist Party politicians